The Artha Wacana Christian University (UKAW or Universitas Kristen Artha Wacana) is a private university located in Kupang, East Nusa Tenggara, Indonesia.

History
The university was founded on 4 September 1985 in Kupang, East Nusa Tenggara as a continuation of Artha Wacana Academy of Theology. 'Artha' can be translated as purpose while 'Wacana' as word (of God) and as a whole, Artha Wacana Christian University means the university where its purpose comes from the word (of God).

Organization

University
Artha Wacana's rector is Ir. Godlief Neonufa, MT

Schools
UKAW is organized into ten faculties, each with a different dean and organization.
 Faculty of Accounting
 Faculty of Law
 Faculty of Management
 Faculty of Management of Marine Resources
 Faculty of Mechanization of Agriculture
 Faculty of English Language Education
 Faculty of Physical Education, Health and Recreation
 Faculty of Technology of The Fishery
 Faculty of Christian Theology

Notes

External links 
 
 The Reformed Ecumenical Council

Universities in Indonesia
Kupang
Universities in East Nusa Tenggara
1985 establishments in Indonesia
Private universities and colleges in Indonesia